The Fell Arboretum is an arboretum located across the campus of Illinois State University in Normal, Illinois.

Early plans for the arboretum began in 1858 when Jesse W. Fell, founder of Illinois State University, contacted landscape designer William Saunders (botanist).  Saunders planned a layout for what would eventually become The Quad for the university's campus.

In 1867, Jesse Fell obtained $3,000 from the state legislature for campus landscaping. Fell planted 1,740 trees on campus that year and 107 trees the following year. An enthusiastic tree planter, Fell wished the campus to contain every tree native to Illinois. In 1995 the campus was formally registered as an arboretum and named in Fell's honor.

Samples
The arboretum contains over 4,000 trees representing over 100 varieties.  Each tree is numbered, marked, and mapped.  species represented include:
 
 Abies concolor
 Acer ginnala
 Acer griseum
 Acer platanoides
 Acer rubrum
 Acer saccharum
 Aesculus glabra
 Aesculus x carnea
 Alnus glutinosa
 Amelanchier arborea
 Aralia spinosa
 Betula alleghaniensis
 Betula nigra
 Betula populifolia
 Broussonetia papyrifera
 Carpinus caroliniana
 Carya illinoensis
 Castanea mollissima
 Catalpa speciosa
 Celtis occidentalis
 Cercidiphyllum japonicum
 Cercis canadensis
 Cladrastis kentukea
 Cornus mas
 Cotinus obovatus
 Crataegus crus-galli
 Crataegus mollis
 Crataegus monogyna
 Diospyros virginiana
 Eucommia ulmoides
 Fagus sylvatica
 Fraxinus americana
 Fraxinus pennsylvanica
 Ginkgo biloba
 Gleditsia triacanthos
  Gymnocladus dioicus
 Halesia carolina
 Juglans nigra
 Juniperus virginiana
 Larix decidua
  Liquidambar styraciflua
 Liriodendron tulipifera
 Magnolia acuminata
 Magnolia stellata
 Magnolia x soulangiana
 Malus coronaria
 Malus cultivar
 Malus ioensis
 Malus sargentii
 Morus alba
 Nyssa sylvatica
 Phellodendron amurense
 Picea abies
 Picea glauca
 Picea pungens
 Pinus mugo
 Pinus nigra
 Pinus resinosa
 Pinus strobus
 Pinus sylvestris
 Platanus occidentalis
 Populus alba
 Prunus padus
 Prunus serotina
 Pseudotsuga menziesii
 Pyrus calleryana
 Quercus alba
 Quercus bicolor
 Quercus coccinea
 Quercus hybrid
 Quercus imbricaria
 Quercus macrocarpa
 Quercus palustris
 Quercus rubra
 Sassafras albidum
 Taxodium distichum
 Tilia americana
 Tilia cordata
 Tsuga canadensis
 Viburnum prunifolium
 Zelkova serrata

Notes

See also 
 List of botanical gardens in the United States

External links 
 
Fell Arboretum (archived version)

Arboreta in Illinois
Botanical gardens in Illinois
Illinois State University
Bloomington–Normal
Protected areas of McLean County, Illinois
Tourist attractions in Bloomington–Normal
1867 establishments in Illinois